Female-specific protein transformer is a protein that in Drosophila melanogaster is encoded by the tra gene. Unlike the related tra2 protein, it is only produced in females.

The transformer protein controls female somatic sexual differentiation. The protein contains an RNA recognition motif. It controls the alternative splicing of the fly sex determination gene doublesex.

References 

Drosophila melanogaster genes
Insect proteins